Jabba Zomalu Lake is an alpine glacial lake located in the Ushu valley of Kalam Upper Swat, Khyber Pakhtunkhwa, Pakistan. Elevation of lake is about 14,000 feet above sea level

See also

Mahodand Lake - Kalam Valley
Kundol Lake - Kalam Valley
Daral Lake - Swat Valley

References

External links 
 Zomalu Lake - Pakistan
 Jabba Zomalu Lake - Kalam Sawat - Pakistan Tourism - YouTube

Lakes of Khyber Pakhtunkhwa
Tourist attractions in Swat
Swat District